The 2014–15 ISU Speed Skating World Cup, officially the Essent ISU World Cup Speed Skating 2014–2015, was a series of international speed skating competitions that ran the entire season. The season started on 14 November 2014 in Obihiro, Japan, and ended with the final on 22 March 2015 in Erfurt, Germany. In total, seven competition weekends were held at six different locations, twelve cups were contested (six for men, and six for women), and 80 races took place.

The World Cup is organized by the International Skating Union (ISU).

Calendar
The detailed schedule for the season. In addition, the team sprint was held as demonstration event in Obihiro and Seoul.

Note: the men's 5000 and 10000 metres was contested as one cup, and the women's 3000 and 5000 metres was contested as one cup, as indicated by the color coding.

Entry rules

Qualification criteria

In order to qualify, skaters had to achieve the following results in ISU events, international competitions or national championships between 1 July 2013 and the entry deadline for the competition concerned.

 in the Olympic Oval, Calgary, or the Utah Olympic Oval, Salt Lake City
 in other ice rinks
 or 6:35.00 on 5000 m
 or 6:40.00 on 5000 m
 or 4:15.00 on 3000 m
 or 4:20.00 on 3000 m

For the mass start and team pursuit events, skaters who had achieved any one of the above results qualified. However, every ISU member nation was allowed to enter a maximum of one skater per gender who had not achieved any of these results, provided that they had achieved a 1500 m result of 1:57.50 (men) or 2:10.00 (women).

Nation quotas

Every ISU member nation was allowed to enter at least one competitor for each distance, subject to the qualification criteria above. Additionally, skaters placed among the top 32 in the final 2013–14 World Cup, or included in the final qualifying list (including the reserve list) of the 2014 Winter Olympics, for the distance category concerned, was allowed entry. Nations were also allowed to earn a quota place for each skater placed on the final qualifying list (excluding the reserve list) for the Olympics. The maximum quota was 5 skaters. A member nation organizing a World Cup competition was granted the maximum quota in all events. Member nations not mentioned were allowed to enter a maximum of one skater for each distance.

For the mass start event, a member nation was allowed to enter a maximum of two skaters, all subject to the qualifying criteria above. For the team pursuit event, a member nation was allowed to enter one team only per category (men/women).

The World Cup competitions 1–4 served as qualifying events for the 2015 World Single Distance Championships. World Cup 5 served as a qualifying event for the 2015 World Allround Championships, and World Cup 6 served as a qualifying event for the 2015 World Sprint Championships. Results from World Cups 1–6 defined the seeding for the Single Distance Championships. World Cups 5 and 6 had extended entry quotas due to their status as qualifying events; each ISU member nation got one more quota place than its highest quota of either of the two distances in the competition, however, the maximum quota was still 5 places.

World records

World records going into the 2014–15 season.

Men

{| class="wikitable" border="1" style="text-align:center"
|-
! Distance
! Time
! Holder(s)
! Nat.
! Date
! Venue
! Reference
|-
| 500 m
| 34.03
| align=left | Jeremy Wotherspoon
| 
| align=right | 9 November 2007
| align=left | Utah Olympic Oval, Salt Lake City
| 
|-
| 1000 m
| 1:06.42
| align=left | Shani Davis
| 
| align=right | 7 March 2009
| align=left | Utah Olympic Oval, Salt Lake City
| 
|-
| 1500 m
| 1:41.04
| align=left | Shani Davis
| 
| align=right | 11 December 2009
| align=left | Utah Olympic Oval, Salt Lake City
| 
|-
| 5000 m
| 6:03.32
| align=left | Sven Kramer
| 
| align=right | 17 November 2007
| align=left | Olympic Oval, Calgary
| 
|-
| 10000 m
| 12:41.69
| align=left | Sven Kramer
| 
| align=right | 10 March 2007
| align=left | Utah Olympic Oval, Salt Lake City
| 
|-
| Team pursuit  (8 laps)
| 3:35.60
| align=left | Koen Verweij  Jan Blokhuijsen  Sven Kramer
| 
| align=right | 16 November 2013
| align=left | Utah Olympic Oval, Salt Lake City
| 
|}

Women

{| class="wikitable" border="1" style="text-align:center"
|-
! Distance
! Time
! Holder(s)
! Nat.
! Date
! Venue
! Reference
|-
| 500 m
| 36.36
| align=left | Lee Sang-hwa
| 
| align=right | 16 November 2013
| align=left | Utah Olympic Oval, Salt Lake City
| 
|-
| 1000 m
| 1:12.58
| align=left | Brittany Bowe
| 
| align=right | 17 November 2013
| align=left | Utah Olympic Oval, Salt Lake City
| 
|-
| 1500 m
| 1:51.79
| align=left | Cindy Klassen
| 
| align=right | 20 November 2005
| align=left | Utah Olympic Oval, Salt Lake City
| 
|-
| 3000 m
| 3:53.34
| align=left | Cindy Klassen
| 
| align=right | 18 March 2006
| align=left | Olympic Oval, Calgary
| 
|-
| 5000 m
| 6:42.66
| align=left | Martina Sáblíková
| 
| align=right | 18 February 2011
| align=left | Utah Olympic Oval, Salt Lake City
| 
|-
| Team pursuit  (6 laps)
| 2:55.79
| align=left | Kristina Groves  Christine Nesbitt  Brittany Schussler
| 
| align=right | 6 December 2009
| align=left | Olympic Oval, Calgary
| 
|}

References

External links 
International Skating Union

Results at ISUresults.eu

 
14-15
Isu Speed Skating World Cup, 2014-15
Isu Speed Skating World Cup, 2014-15